Our Lady of Mercy High School is a registered historic building in Cincinnati, Ohio, listed in the National Register on March 3, 1980. The creator of this school is Samuel Hannaford

Historic uses 
Church School, Job Corps adult education school and Job training school as of 1988

Location
1409 Western Ave.
Cincinnati, Hamilton County, Ohio, United States
45214

Notes

External links
Documentation from the University of Cincinnati

National Register of Historic Places in Cincinnati
Private schools in Cincinnati